The following lists events that happened in 2016 in the Kingdom of Saudi Arabia.

Incumbents
Monarch: Salman
Crown Prince: Muhammad bin Nayef

Events

January
 January 2 - 47 alleged terrorists are executed by the Saudi state, including leader of the anti-government Shia movement, Sheikh Nimr al-Nimr.
 January 2 - The embassy of Saudi Arabia in Tehran, Iran, is ransacked and set on fire by protesters against al-Nimr's execution.
 January 3 - Saudi Arabia breaks off diplomatic relations with Iran after the events that happened on January 2.
 January 4 - Saudi Arabia announces it will end all air traffic and trade links with Iran, demanding Iran to "act like a normal country" before severed diplomatic relations can be restored.
 January 5 - The Islamic State of Iraq and the Levant threatens to destroy Saudi Arabia's Tarfiya and al-Ha'ir prisons, holding ISIL prisoners.
 January 12 - Saudi human rights activist Samar Badawi is arrested by Saudi police.

April
 April 16 - Mariam Fardous became the first ever Arab woman and only the third woman in history to dive in the North Pole.

October
 October 25 - Shooting left 2 security forces dead in Dammam city.

Notable deaths
2 January – Nimr al-Nimr, Shia religious leader (born 1959).
2 January – Faris al-Zahrani, (born 1977).

References

 
2010s in Saudi Arabia
Saudi Arabia
Saudi Arabia
Years of the 21st century in Saudi Arabia